Starzeńska may refer to the following places in Poland:

Dąbrówka Starzeńska
Grabownica Starzeńska